"Oceans (Where Feet May Fail)" is a song by Australian worship group Hillsong United. It was released on 23 August 2013 as the second and final single from their third studio album, Zion (2013). The song is led by Taya Smith, and was written by Matt Crocker, Joel Houston and Salomon Ligthelm, with production being handled by Michael Guy Chislett.

In the United States, the song spent a record 61 non-consecutive weeks at No. 1 on the Billboard Hot Christian Songs chart. In the year-end summaries, it was the chart's No. 1 song in 2014 and 2016, No. 2 in 2015, and No. 10 in 2017. Billboard ranked it as the No. 1 Christian song of the 2010s decade. The song was certified quadruple platinum in the United States.

Writing and background 

The song ideas began early in the production of the album. Crocker worked with Ligthelm later back in Australia to write more of the lyrics and Ligthelm helped deciding that the theme of the song should be about stepping into the unknown and Peter having blind trust to walk on water. Much of the melody was written over the course of 10 days at Houston's apartment in New York. The last lyrics were written at a waterfall on the final day of recording.

The song was recorded by singer Taya Smith who sang many parts of the song in one take.

Awards
The song won many of the main categories at the 2014 GMA Dove Awards. It won the "Song of the Year", "Contemporary Christian Performance of the Year", "Pop/Contemporary Song of the Year", "Worship Song of the Year", and Hillsong United was named the "Artist of the Year". In turn, the Australian group was the winner in the Top Christian Artist category and the song "Oceans (Where Feet May Fail)" was chosen as Top Christian Song at the 2016 Billboard Music Awards.

Critical reception
Ryan Barbee of Jesus Freak Hideout said "'Oceans (Where Feet May Fail)' continues [the album] with a more intimate tone and will surely grasp the heart of the listener as the song reiterates, 'Spirit lead me where my trust is without boarders [sic], let me walk upon the waters wherever you would call me'. The music builds and builds to a gorgeous climax that will pull on your heartstrings whilst being encouraged by the faith that only the Holy Spirit can give." Louder Than the Music's Jono Davies stated "[Oceans] has a stunning orchestral opening before out of nowhere a voice hits you. The voice is stunning, yet haunting, all in the same breath. The song then builds musically from atmospheric haunting tones to sheer epicness. I can hear people just getting lost in worship at a Hillsong conference to this song."

In 2021, Dutch DJ group Dash Berlin created a remix of the song.

Chart performance
"Oceans (Where Feet May Fail)" reached No. 1 on the Billboard Hot Christian Songs chart, and stayed atop of the charts for 45 consecutive weeks until it was dethroned by Carrie Underwood's "Something in the Water" in October 2014. The song rebounded to No. 1 for another five weeks until the chart week of 23 May 2015, marking a total of 50 non-consecutive weeks atop of the chart. In total, the song spent a record 61 weeks atop of the chart.

As of May 2022, Oceans has the most total weeks on Billboard's "Hot Christian Songs" chart with 191 weeks.

It became the longest running No. 1 song on the chart, before "You Say" broke the record in 2019.

Track listing

Charts

Weekly charts

Year-end charts

Decade-end charts

Certifications

Release history

References

Sparrow Records singles
Capitol Records singles
2013 songs
2013 singles
Hillsong United songs